Cattani is an Italian surname. Notable people with the surname include:

Costanzo Cattani, or Francesco Costanzo Cattani (1602-1665), Italian painter
Federico Cattani Amadori (1856–1943), Italian Cardinal of the Roman Catholic Church
Francesco Cattani da Diacceto (1466–1522), Italian Neoplatonist philosopher, grandfather of Francesco Cattani Bishop of Fiesole
Francesco Cattani da Diacceto (1531–1595), Italian Bishop of Fiesole
Gabriele Cattani, Italian astronomer
Giacomo Cattani (1823-1887), Italian Catholic Cardinal and Archbishop
Heinz Cattani (1908–2001), Swiss bobsledder 
Leone Cattani (1906-1980), Italian lawyer, politician and anti-Fascist activist
Marta Cattani (born 1973), retired Italian basketball player
Oberdan Cattani (1919–2014), Brazilian football player
Sophie Cattani, French actress

See also
Adamoli-Cattani fighter 

Italian-language surnames